Darius Powe (born March 15, 1994) is a former American football wide receiver. He played college football at California.

Professional career
Powe signed with the New York Giants as an undrafted free agent on May 6, 2016. 

He was waived by the Giants on September 3, 2016 and was signed to the practice squad the next day. 

After spending his entire rookie season on the practice squad, Powe signed a future contract with the Giants on January 9, 2017.

On August 23, 2017, Powe was waived/injured by the Giants and placed on injured reserve. He was released on August 29, 2017. He was re-signed to the Giants' practice squad on October 9, 2017. 

He was promoted to the active roster on December 6, 2017. He made his NFL debut the following week, recording two catches for 13 yards before suffering a broken foot. He was placed on injured reserve on December 11, 2017. 

He was waived by the Giants on April 23, 2018 after the acquisition punter Riley Dixon.

References

External links
California Golden Bears bio

1994 births
Living people
American football wide receivers
California Golden Bears football players
New York Giants players
People from Lakewood, California
Players of American football from California
Sportspeople from Los Angeles County, California